The Slovakia men's national under-20 basketball team is a national basketball team of Slovakia, administered by the Slovak Basketball Association. It represents the country in international men's under-20 basketball competitions.

FIBA U20 European Championship participations

See also
Slovakia men's national basketball team
Slovakia men's national under-18 basketball team
Slovakia women's national under-20 basketball team

References

External links
Archived records of Slovakia team participations

Basketball in Slovakia
Basketball
Men's national under-20 basketball teams